Marganell is a municipality in the comarca of the Bages in Catalonia, Spain. It is situated on the northern slopes of Montserrat, and is also known as Santa Cecília de Montserrat in reference to the Benedictine monasteries (See Santa Cecília de Montserrat and Montserrat monastery). The agriculture in the municipality is mostly of cereals, and the majority of the active population works elsewhere (until recently, in the cotton mills of Castellbell i el Vilar).

Demography

References

 Panareda Clopés, Josep Maria; Rios Calvet, Jaume; Rabella Vives, Josep Maria (1989). Guia de Catalunya, Barcelona: Caixa de Catalunya.  (Spanish).  (Catalan).

External links
Information at Consell Comarcal 
 Government data pages 

Municipalities in Bages